Eraclio Catalin Rodríguez Cereijo, better known as Horacio Guarany (May 15, 1925 – January 13, 2017), was one of the main Argentine folklore singers, and a writer. Guarany died on January 13, 2017, at the age of 91.

He was born in Las Garzas, Santa Fe Province, the thirteenth child of Jorge Rodríguez, a Guaraní man from Corrientes, and Feliciana Cereijo, a Spanish woman from León. He was a member and supporter of the Communist Party of Argentina, which led to him being persecuted by the Argentine Anticommunist Alliance, and forced him into exile in 1974. He settled in Venezuela, later moving to Mexico and Spain. He returned to Argentina in 1978. The military dictatorship made all their records disappear, in addition to censoring the diffusion of some songs such as "La guerrillera" or "Coplera del prisionero", among others.

References

External links

1925 births
2017 deaths
20th-century Argentine male singers
Argentine folk singers
Argentine communists
People from General Obligado Department
Argentine people of Guaraní descent
Argentine people of Spanish descent
Argentine expatriates in Mexico
Argentine expatriates in Spain
Argentine expatriates in Venezuela